In poetry, trochaic tetrameter is a meter featuring lines composed of four trochaic feet. The etymology of trochaic derives from the Greek trokhaios, from the verb trecho, meaning I run. In classical metre, a trochee is a foot consisting of a long syllable followed by a short syllable; in modern English poetry, a trochee is a foot consisting of a stressed syllable followed by an unstressed syllable. In classical metre, the word tetrameter means a line with four metra, wherein each metron contains two trochees, thus eight trochees; and, in the metre of modern poetry, trochaic tetrameter is a poetic line with four trochees.

Example of trochaic tetrameter
The rhythm of a line of trochaic tetrameter is:

Using the symbols of classical poetry, the longum and the breve (brevis) a line of trochaic tetrameter is represented as:

When the tetrameter is catalectic, the last syllable of the line is omitted.

Literature
The Song of Hiawatha
An example of epic poetry written in trochaic tetrameter s The Song of Hiawatha (1855), by Henry Wadsworth Longfellow; in the excerpt from the stanzas about “Hiawatha’s Childhood”, the bold text indicates the accented syllables of each trochee:

A Midsummer Night’s Dream
William Shakespeare employed trochaic tetrameter in A Midsummer Night's Dream (1594), in the dialogues of the fairies, which are written in catalectic trochaic tetrameter; Puck speaks:

The conversation between Puck and Oberon is written in catalectic trochaic tetrameter:

King Lear
The character of Edgar disguised as “Poor Tom”, in King Lear (1605):

Macbeth
The Three Witches in Macbeth (1606):

Latin liturgy
In the 13th century hymns written in medieval Latin, the Dies Irae (0000) is the poetry sequence of the Roman Catholic requiem mass, the first two verses are:

. . . and in the Stabat Mater (0000) meditation on the suffering of Mary, during the Jesus crucifixion, the first two verses are:

Kalevala meter
Balto-Finnic (e.g. Estonian, Finnish, Karelian) folk poetry uses a form of trochaic tetrameter that has been called the Kalevala meter. The Finnish and Estonian national epics, Kalevala and Kalevipoeg, are both written in this meter. The meter is thought to have originated during the Proto-Finnic period. Its main rules are as follows (examples are taken from the Kalevala):

Syllables fall into three types: strong, weak, and neutral. A long syllable (one that contains a long vowel or a diphthong, or ends in a consonant) with a main stress is metrically strong, and a short syllable with a main stress is metrically weak. All syllables without a main stress are metrically neutral. A strong syllable can only occur in the rising part of the second, third, and fourth foot of a line:

A weak syllable can only occur in the falling part of these feet:

Neutral syllables can occur at any position. The first foot has a freer structure, allowing strong syllables in a falling position and weak syllables in a rising position:

It is also possible for the first foot to contain three or even four syllables.

There are two main types of line: a normal trochaic tetrameter and a broken trochaic tetrameter. In a normal tetrameter, word-stresses and foot-stresses match, and there is a caesura between the second and third feet:

A broken tetrameter (Finnish murrelmasäe) has at least one stressed syllable in a falling position. There is usually no caesura:

Traditional poetry in the Kalevala meter uses both types with approximately the same frequency. The alteration of normal and broken tetrameters is a characteristic difference between the Kalevala meter and other forms of trochaic tetrameter.

References

Types of verses